Parasmodix is a genus of spiders in the family Thomisidae. It was first described in 1966 by Jézéquel. , it contains only one species, Parasmodix quadrituberculata, found in Ivory Coast.

References

Endemic fauna of Ivory Coast
Thomisidae
Monotypic Araneomorphae genera
Spiders of Africa